Banian (also Romanized as Banīān, Banyān, and Bonyān; also known as Banyoon and Banyūn) is a village in Ahram Rural District, in the Central District of Tangestan County, Bushehr Province, Iran. At the 2006 census, its population was 238, in 61 families.

References 

Populated places in Tangestan County